North Korean abductions may refer to:

North Korean abductions of South Koreans
North Korean abductions of Japanese citizens
Doina Bumbea, a Romanian abductee in North Korea
Anocha Panjoy, a Thailandese abductee in North Korea

See also
List of foreign nationals detained in North Korea